The 62nd Bodil Awards were held on 1 March 2009 in Imperial Cinema in Copenhagen, Denmark, honouring the best national and foreign films of 1009. Lasse Rimmer hosted the event. Henrik Ruben Genz's Terribly Happy was the big winner at the ceremony, receiving both the award for Best Film and for Best Actor and Actress in leading roles. There Will Be Blood won the award for Best American Film while Swedish Let The Right One In won Best Non-American Foreign Film.

Jørgen Leth received a Bodil Honorary Award and Kåre Bjerkø received a Special Award for having scored three of the nominated films.

Winners

Best Danish Film 
 Terribly Happy
 Flame & Citron
 Gå med fred Jamil
 Lille soldat
 Worlds Apart

Best Actor in a Leading Role 
 Jakob Cedergren – Terribly Happy
 Henning Jensen – Gaven
 Thure Lindhardt – Flame & Citron
 Dar Salim – Gå med fred Jamil
 Ulrich Thomsen – Den du frygter

Best Actress in a Leading Role 
 Lene Maria Christensen – Terribly Happy
 Laura Christensen – Dig og mig
 Trine Dyrholm – Lille soldat
 Mette Horn – Max Pinlig
 Rosalinde Spanning – Worlds Apart

Best Actor in a Supporting Role 
 Kim Bodnia – Terribly Happy
 Lars Brygmann – Terribly Happy
 Finn Nielsen – Lille soldat
 Henrik Prip – Spillets regler
 Jens Jørn Spottag – Worlds Apart

Best Actress in a Supporting Role 
 Sarah Boberg – Worlds Apart
 Emma Sehested Høeg – Den du frygter
 Ghita Nørby – Det som ingen ved
 Paprika Steen – Den du frygter

Best American Film 
 There Will Be Blood
 The Dark Knight
 No Country for Old Men
 Vicky Cristina Barcelona

Best Non-American Film 
 Let the Right One In
 Børnehjemmet
 Control
 Gomorra
 Everlasting Moments

Best Cinematographer 
 Jørgen Johansson – Flame & Citron

Best Documentary Film 
Burma VJ

Bodil Special Award 
Kåre Bjerkø for scoring Det som ingen ved, Terribly Happy and øø Lille soldat

Bodil Honorary Award 
Jørgen Leth

See also 

 2009 Robert Awards

References 

2008 film awards
Bodil Awards ceremonies
2009 in Copenhagen
March 2009 events in Europe